Tesfa "Taz" Wube is an Ethiopian-American marketing executive, entertainment promoter, and venue owner. Wub attended Ohio State University and is a member of Kappa Alpha Psi fraternity. Wube has over 10 years of lounge/nightclub and marketing experience. He was a successful member of the team Influence Marketing which conceptualized Love Nightclub and nurtured it into one of the premiere entertainment destinations on the East Coast. He
served as the marketing and promotions director at Love Nightclub for 7 years. In addition to the success of Love as a Washington, D.C., staple, Wube played a part in the opening and development of The Park at 14th Restaurant and Lounge.

From Dream to Love, the Marc and Taz Brand 

Wube arrived in Washington, D.C., in 1998. He began promotions at Republic Gardens. Wube started working with the entertainment lifestyle mogul, Marc Barnes.

Wube became the marketing director of Dream Nightclub in 2001. He played a crucial part of the relaunch and re-branding of Dream Nightclub. Dream Nightclub became Love Nightclub.

Shortly following the opening of their second venue together 'The Park at 14th', in 2008, Marc and Taz parted ways amicably.

Suite 202 and Taz Events 

Wube manages his own event management and marketing company, Suite 202. Sparing no expense and continuing his diligent reputation as a lifestyle promoter, Taz Wube still commands the attention of patrons in the Washington, D.C., area and beyond. Outside of mainstay events, Suite 202 has hosted various special events such as: Steve Francis Roast & After Party Concert, "More Than A Game" Movie World Premiere Party for LeBron James, Dallas Mavericks Caron Butler’s Worldwide Tour in Los Angeles and Miami, recording artist Wale & Oklahoma City Thunder Kevin Durant’s Birthday Party, Howard University's Homecoming with Kid Cudi and The Clipse, Baltimore Raven’s Willis McGahee & Antwan Barnes Birthday Party, and the list goes on.

Party Boyz 

Taz Wube made his television debut, alongside then-partner Marc Barnes, in the series entitled Party Boyz. The show, which aired on the TV One network, chronicled the fast-paced daily lives of Marc and Taz as leaders in nightlife entertainment.

References

External links 
 Suite 202 DC Official Site

Living people
American entertainment industry businesspeople
Year of birth missing (living people)